The Diocese of Cibaliana (in Latin Rite Cibalianensis) is a home suppressed and titular of the Catholic Church.

Cibaliana, in modern Tunisia, is the seat of the ancient episcopal see. In the Roman Empire, it was a civitas of the Roman province of Byzacena.

There are two known bishops of this ancient episcopal see.
Donato was present at the Council of Carthage of 256, where he discussed the problem of the Lapsi.
The Donatist Bishop Cresconio, at the Council of Carthage in 411. There was no competitor Catholic bishop at this time.

Today Cibaliana survives as titular bishop; the current owner Bishop Geraldo Dantas de Andrade, former auxiliary bishop of São Luís do Maranhão.

References 

Ancient Berber cities
Catholic titular sees in Africa
Roman towns and cities in Tunisia